Saints Wulfhad and Ruffin (or Wulfhade, Wulfad) were legendary 7th-century Christian martyrs from the royal family of Mercia.
They were said to have been baptized by Saint Chad of Mercia, and their pagan father was said to have killed them at Stone, Staffordshire, England.
Their feast day is 24 July.

Butler's account

The hagiographer Alban Butler wrote the following account in his The Lives of the Fathers, Martyrs, and Other Principal Saints (1833),

Legendary nature

The story of Wulfhad and Ruffinus, the supposed brothers of Saint Wærburh, is almost entirely fictional and may have been composed after the Norman Conquest (1066).
Walter de Whittlesey, a monk of Peterborough Abbey, compiled and wrote an account of Saints Wulfhad and Ruffin, sons of King Wulfhere, who was supposed to have been the founder of Peterborough Abbey.
A foundation charter of Peterborough Abbey dated 664 is in fact a forgery from the 12th century.
Fabrications such as this to prove the ancient origin of a religious foundation were common at this time.
According to the legend, Wulfhere murdered his sons because they had become Christians, and then repented and founded several monasteries.

The brothers were said to be enshrined in the Augustinian priory of Stone founded under King Henry I of England (r. 1100–1135) which may have replaced a church dedicated to Wulfhad.
A 14th-century Vita (Life) from the Stone Priory claimed it was founded in Mercia in the early years of Christianity in England and said it held the relics of Wulfhad and Ruffinus, two sons of King Wulfhere of Mercia.
However, Ruffinus is not a plausible name for a son of Wulfhere.
Wulfhad is not mentioned in any of the late Anglo-Saxon material that describes the family of Wulfhere and his wife Eormenhild of Kent, and other early Mercian saints.
The Domesday Book (1086) does not mention a minster at Stone.
The story seems to have been created from an account by Bede of two princes from the Isle of Wight who were martyred at Stoneham in Hampshire.

Notes

Sources

Further reading

Mercian saints
7th-century deaths